Joe Tynan (born 1950) is an Irish former hurler. At club level he played with Roscrea and was also a member of the Tipperary senior hurling team.

Career

Tynan first played hurling at juvenile and underage levels with the Roscrea club. He was part of the club's minor team that won consecutive North Tipperary MHC titles from 1966 and 1967, before later winning a Tipperary U21AHC title in 1968. By that stage Tynan had already joined the club's senior team and won the first of seven North Tipperary SHC titles and six Tipperary SHC medals. He top scored with two goals when Roscrea beat St. Rynagh's in the 1971 All-Ireland club final.

Performances at club level earned Tynan a call-up to the Tipperary minor hurling team, however, his two-year tenure with the team ended without success as Cork dominated the championship at the time. He also spent four seasons with the under-21 team at a time when Cork also dominated that championship. Tynan joined the senior team in 1970 but was later dropped before returning to the team in 1975.

Honours

Roscrea
All-Ireland Senior Club Hurling Championship: 1971
Munster Senior Club Hurling Championship: 1969, 1970
Tipperary Senior Hurling Championship: 1968, 1969, 1970, 1972, 1973, 1980
North Tipperary Senior Hurling Championship: 1967, 1968, 1969, 1970, 1971, 1980, 1982
Tipperary Under-21 A Hurling Championship: 1968
Tipperary Minor A Hurling Championship: 1966, 1967

References

External link

 Joe Tynan player profile

1950 births
Living people
Roscrea hurlers
Tipperary inter-county hurlers